Trebichava is a village and municipality in Bánovce nad Bebravou District in the Trenčín Region of north-western Slovakia.

History
In historical records the village was first mentioned in 1396.

Geography
The municipality lies at an altitude of 340 metres and covers an area of 11.765 km². It has a population of about 35 people.

References

External links

 Official page
http://www.statistics.sk/mosmis/eng/run.html

Villages and municipalities in Bánovce nad Bebravou District